Jakob Lenz is a one-act chamber opera by Wolfgang Rihm, written 1977–78 to a libretto by Michael Fröhling after Georg Büchner's 1836 novella Lenz which in turn is based on an incident in the life of the German poet Jakob Michael Reinhold Lenz (1751–1792). Rihm dedicated the opera to his teacher, .

Rihm received for Jakob Lenz the Beethoven Prize of the city of Bonn in 1980.


Performance history

The first performance was given at the Hamburg State Opera on 8 March 1979. It was first performed in the United States in 1981 at Indiana University and in New York at the Juilliard Theatre in 1987. The UK premiere was in 1987 at the Almeida Festival. There was an English National Opera/Hampstead Theatre co-production at the Hampstead Theatre in London in April 2012, given in celebration of the 60th birthday of the composer. It was directed by Sam Brown, and conducted by Alexander Ingram, with Andrew Shore in the leading role.

Roles and orchestra

The opera is scored for 2 oboes (2nd doubling cor anglais), clarinet (doubling bass clarinet), bassoon (doubling contrabassoon), trumpet, trombone, 3 cellos, harpsichord, percussion.

References

Operas by Wolfgang Rihm
German-language operas
One-act operas
Operas
Chamber operas
1979 operas
Operas based on novels
Operas about writers
Music dedicated to students or teachers
Adaptations of works by Georg Büchner